"In Fact" is the 22nd single by Japanese boy band KAT-TUN, released in Japan on June 4, 2014, under the label J-One Records.  "In Fact" is the main theme song for TV drama series First Class starring Yuichi Nakamaru, which premieres April 19. The first-run limited edition and regular edition also contain "Believe In Myself," the theme song for "Going! Sports & News" featuring Kamenashi Kazuya, and the image song for Nippon Television networks Professional Baseball broadcast "Dramatic Game 1844."

In Fact debuted at the number one spot top the Oricon weekly single chart, selling over 145,872 copies in its first week of release. KAT-TUN achieved their 22nd consecutive No.1 with their 22nd single, "In Fact". They are currently behind Kinki Kids who are with 33 consecutive No.1 singles since debut. In Fact sold 6,997 copies in its second week. The single has sold 160,192 copies so far.

Single information
In Fact is the twenty-second single release from KAT-TUN, released approximately one year after their previous single Face to Face. The release comes in three versions - Regular Edition, Limited Edition, and First Press Edition . All versions of the album include "In Fact",  and "Believe In Myself". The Regular Edition contains six track, with "Birds" and original karaoke included. The Regular Edition (First Press) contains seven tracks, with My Secret", "Black" and "Dangerous" and original karaoke included. The Limited Edition includes "In Fact" and "Believe In Myself" on CD, comes with a bonus DVD with a music video for the title song and its making-of.

Promotion
In Fact Bundled Set of All 3 Editions comes with a bonus of KAT-TUN "B2-sized poster".

Track listing

Charts

References

External links
 In Fact product information

KAT-TUN songs
2014 singles
Japanese television drama theme songs
Oricon Weekly number-one singles
2014 songs